The Outsiders Are Back is the first full-length album by the Milwaukee, Wisconsin-based soul band Kings Go Forth. It was released in April 2010 on the Luaka Bop label. The album consists of ten original songs written by band members Andy Noble and Black Wolf. The album received positive reviews. The album's cover, and likely its title, are based on a fictional album cover designed by "imaginary soul superstar" Mingering Mike.

Track listing
All songs written by Andy Noble and Black Wolf.
One Day – 4:14
I Don't Love You No More – 4:20
You're the One – 4:08
Fight with Love – 3:40
High on Your Love – 4:15
Paradise Lost – 5:31
Don't Take My Shadow – 6:09
Now We're Gone – 4:02
1000 Songs – 4:34
Get a Feeling – 2:38

Personnel

Musicians
Black Wolf - vocals
Danny Fernandez - vocals
Matt Norberg - vocals, guitar
Dan Flynn - lead guitar
Andy Noble - bass
Dave Wake - keyboards
Jeremy Kuzniar - drums
Dave Cusma - trombone, trumpet
Jed Groser - trumpet
Cecilio Negron, Jr, - congas, percussion, background vocals
Eric Jacobson - trumpet
Aaron Gardner - flute, tenor saxophone

Production
Andy Noble and Dave Cusma - producers
Andy Noble - arranger
Andy Noble and Jeremy Kuzniar - mixing
Jeremy Kuzniar and Danny Zelonky - engineering
Tom Moulton - mixing
Glenn Meadows - mastering

References 

2010 albums
Luaka Bop albums